This Man... This Woman is a 1989 mini series about a man who loses his job and has an affair.

Cast 
 Robert Coleby as Neil Clarke
 Catherine Wilkin as Marion Clarke
 Tina Bursill as Liz Maddocks
 Ben Mendelsohn as Matthew Clarke
 Rachael Beck as Susan Clarke 
 Andrew Ferguson as Danny Clarke
 Lucy Bayler as Kathy Robinson
 Max Phipps as Barry Farmer
 Ruth Yaffe as Betty
 Gabriella Clark as Veronica
 Helen Francis as Judy
 Suzanne Warner as Belinda
 John Gregg (actor) as Joe Laurence
 Warwick Moss as Ray
 Patsy Martin as Mrs Braithwaite
 Janet Andrewartha as Pat
 Ernie Grey as Dr Simmonds
 Alethea McGrath as Sheila
 Irini Pappas as Anna-Maria
 Richard Moss as Peter Goddard
 Andrew Spence as Warren Lang

References

External links
This Man... This Woman at IMDb
This Man... This Woman at Crawfords Australia

1980s Australian television miniseries
1989 Australian television series debuts
1989 Australian television series endings
1989 television films
1989 films
Films directed by Paul Moloney